Fly-in fly-out is a method of employing people in remote areas by flying them temporarily to the work site instead of relocating employees and their families permanently. It is often abbreviated to FIFO when referring to employment status. This is common in large mining regions in Australia and Canada.

Similar to the fly-in fly-out roster is the DIDO (drive-in drive-out) roster, which has essentially the same benefits and drawbacks.

Overview
Rather than relocating employees and their families to a town near the work site, the employees are flown to the work site, where they work for a number of days, and are then flown back to their hometowns for a number of days of rest.

Fly-in fly-out is very commonly used in the mining and oil and gas drilling industries, as mines and wells are often in areas far from towns. Generally, such sites use portable buildings since there is no long-term commitment to that location (e.g., the mine will close once the minerals have been extracted, the drilling rig will be moved once the well is dug). The local communities prefer for FIFO workers to purchase homes in the area and have more permanent opportunities because it would benefit the local economy. However, mining companies prefer not to provide permanent residencies such as company towns to FIFO workers because it saves the company money. The use of FIFO is a response to the precarity of resource extraction sectors: the workers can be shipped in quickly during resource booms and sent away during busts.

Usually, a fly-in fly-out job involves working a long shift (e.g., 12 hours each day) for a number of continuous days with all days off spent at home rather than at the work site. As the employee's work days are almost entirely taken up by working, sleeping, and eating, there is little need for any recreation facilities at the work site. However, companies are increasingly offering facilities such as pools, tennis courts, and gyms as a way of attracting and retaining skilled staff. Employees may be drawn to such arrangements since their families are often reluctant to relocate to small towns in remote areas where there might be limited opportunities for spouses' employment, limited educational choices for children, and poor recreational facilities.

Psychological effects
Fly-in fly-out employment can put stress on family relationships, and the phenomenon may stifle regional development. There is a high mental cost to the workers and their families, with several government inquiries into its detrimental effects.

Family 
The impact of absent FIFO parents (primarily fathers) on their children and schooling has yet to be the subject of a major study, but it is likely that the separation anxiety experienced by the children of FIFO workers is similar to that of military families before, during and after deployment.  Research published in Australia in 2014 suggests that children of fly-in fly-out parents suffer emotionally from the parent's absence, more frequently become the targets of schoolyard bullying, and may evince additional bad behaviour.  However, such children often receive greater incentive to succeed academically, and some such children appreciate the extended time at home available for FIFO parents.

Worker mental health 
A federal inquiry into fly-in fly-out and drive-in drive-out in Australia in 2012 found that it can lead to an increase in substance abuse, sexually transmitted infections, and mental illness in workers on a FIFO roster, especially in Western Australia, where the number of people on such a roster is in excess of 50,000. A Queensland inquiry into the effects of fly-in fly-out was conducted in 2016.

Results from studies on compressed work schedules, shift work, and extended working hours (seen in other industries as well such as nursing) show that no matter what type of shift roster, there is a need for sufficient rest days to allow recuperation from the sleep debt. It is dangerous for workers to travel and work at their sites in such states of fatigue. Disruption of sleep schedules and circadian rhythms causes a significant impact on performance. It is also detrimental to the mental health of FIFO workers, causing stress and anxiety as well as increased use of drugs and alcohol. According to studies, eight consecutive work days of twelve-hour shifts is the maximum which employees are able to perform well at before fatigue begins to affect work adversely.

Australia
In 2015, the Western Australian government instituted a support policy for FIFO workers.

Mining companies like Fortescue Metals Group estimate that it would cost the company an additional $100,000 per person per year to employ them in residential positions rather than as FIFO workers. In Port Hedland alone the company could save $33 million a year if it was to convert its 330-strong work force from residential to FIFO, the company estimates. The much higher cost of employing residential workers is caused by high real estate prices, slow release of land for residential development and high cost of living subsidies and forces mining companies to rely on FIFO rather than residential workers.  Such a strategy has been employed in some mining towns that once had a considerable size. For example, Wiluna in Western Australia had a population of 9,000 in 1938, but now has a population of 300, with almost all employees of the local mines on fly-in fly-out rosters.

Mining companies such as Rio Tinto have said that it is also the government's responsibility to deal with the side effects of fly-in fly-out, including housing shortages and the need to develop further infrastructure in the mining regions such as hospitals and schools to fulfil demand, as the Government benefits greatly from increased tax and royalties income through the mining boom. Rio Tinto paid $5 billion in corporate tax and in excess of $2 billion in state royalties in 2011.

Economic and social impact on communities 
FIFO (as well as DIDO) work forces create a temporary rise in population of the regional communities that they are assigned to. This in turn can put pressures on the existing population's living space capacity and resources as the existing businesses fail to receive increased sales due to lack of reciprocity of FIFO organizations. This is supported by findings from Canada which suggest that the all-encompassing services provided at mining camps reduce the ability of fly-in workers to integrate into local communities by buying goods and services from local businesses or joining local organizations.  Improved integration practices as well sharing resources are necessary for FIFO organizations to encourage employees into more community participation. The local towns also argue that more effort should be given towards making local employment and residential options available.

Based on the life of the mining job, it is preferred by the local economy for FIFO workers to purchase homes in the area; however, both parties (mining company and mining employees) would need to agree. The lack of permanent housing for FIFO workers distorts the local census causing a disproportion to the local price cycles such as housing valuation. FIFO workers also make it difficult for local communities to have availability for tourism due to the large renting out of housing units at a fringe tax benefit. There are quite a few circumstances that stray mining companies as well as FIFO workers away from making those decisions. For example, there is better compensation being a FIFO employee rather than a local worker due to allowances given for being away from home. The use of permanent settlement would minimize the flexibility for mining companies to invest and shift resources between mining locations. Permanent residencies for FIFO workers would however mean a reduction of industrial conflicts for the local area, but it would also create less of an exit option for the FIFO workers. According to a case study from 2014, the housing issue in local towns has led to families finding these resource towns unattractive which has also resulted in an increase of prices in the housing market.

Benefits 
Australia's resource sector (coal, oil and gas, metal ore, etc) is a major contributor to the economy. Projects in these sectors such as commercial mineral projects indirectly created more jobs such as retail, hospitality, manufacturing, etc. In 2012, there was a shortage of skilled workers for steel, fabrications and resource related jobs specifically in Western Australia The skilled worker shortage paired with the exit of baby boomers in the labour market, as well as the lack of labour market entry by Generation Y, caused the major introduction of FIFO workers into the mix. In order to meet recruitment needs, in 2012 Australian resource sector employers began turning to temporary skilled workers using the 457 visas. Measures were taken so that the 457 visa was not abused as replacements for already available skilled workers in Australia. These time-consuming and complex measures included: skill assessments for certain opportunities and English proficiency, requirement of a sponsor to start working within 90 days of arrival, accept visa restrictions for start-up companies, and much more. Businesses also had to ensure that the open positions were advertised and offered to local skilled citizens or permanent residents first as well as present evidence of training locals at the cost of at least 1 percent of their payroll. Salary restrictions on 457 visas also made it difficult for firms to attract FIFO workers especially with competition from larger projects in other regions. Smaller firms in Australia were able to grow and gain legitimacy through the use of the migrant worker visas. However, along with the costs to obtain the visas and training fees, smaller firms also incurred heavy costs for relocation at around $30,000 per employee.

Effect of the COVID-19 pandemic 
Regular travel across jurisdictional boundaries, and living in close proximity are inherent to this type of work, which causes major challenges during the social distancing measures used during the COVID-19 pandemic.

References

Further reading
 Garrick Moore: Mining Towns of Western Australia , published: 1996

External links
 Rio Tinto's Fly-in Fly-out information
 Workforce Turnover in FIFO Mining Operations in Australia: An Exploratory Study A research report by Centre for Social Responsibility in Mining and Minerals Industry Safety and Health Centre Summary Report

Commuting
Working conditions
Mining culture and traditions
Economy of Western Australia
Mining in Australia
Aviation in Australia
Aviation in Western Australia
Economy of Queensland
Employment in Australia
Economy of Canada
Mining in Canada
Rural society